The 30th Mechanized Infantry Brigade ("Tomoritsa") is a unit of the Hellenic Army based in Lagos, Western Thrace.

Structure 
 HQ Company (ΙΣΤ)
 30th Signal Company (30 ΛΔΒ)
 30th Engineer Company (30 ΛΜΧ)
 16th Armored Battalion (16 ΕΜΑ)
 516th Mechanized Infantry Battalion (516 M/K ΤΠ)
 564th Mechanized Infantry Battalion (564 M/K ΤΠ)
 565th  Infantry Battalion (565 ΤΠ)
 129th Self Propelled Artillery Battalion (129 Μ Α/K ΠΒ)
 30th Antitank Company (30 ΛΑΤ)
 30th Support Battalion (30 ΤΥΠ)

Mechanized infantry brigades of Greece
Evros (regional unit)